Kathryn Maria Leng (born 28 September 1973 in Pudsey) is a former English cricketer for England Women, Yorkshire and Bradford/Leeds UCCE.

Born in Pudsey, Yorkshire, Leng was U-19 captain for England Women and first played for the senior squad in a One-Day International in 1995. In April 1999, Leng played for Yorkshire Bank first team in the Bradford Cricket League, the first woman to play in that league, and became the first woman to play inter UCCE cricket in 2001. She was dropped from England's one-day squad in 2002 after taking an unauthorized holiday in Tenerife. Although she was recalled for the 2003 tour of Australia, her last Test match was in February 2003. Her highest Test score came in 1996, with 144 against New Zealand, which is the record for the highest individual score by any cricketer when batting at number 7 position or lower in Women's Test history.

References

External links
 
 

1973 births
Living people
England women Test cricketers
England women One Day International cricketers
People educated at Woodhouse Grove School
Cricketers from Pudsey
Yorkshire women cricketers